Karachi East District is an administrative district of Karachi Division in Sindh, Pakistan.

History 
The district was established in 1972.

The district was abolished in 2000, and was divided into four towns namely:
 Gulshan Town 
 Jamshed Town
 Gulzar-e-Hijri Town
 Faisal Cantonment
 Feroz Abad Town.

On 11 July 2015, the Sindh Government restored again Karachi East District.

In November 2013, three eastern towns of Karachi East District separated to form a new District named Korangi also Jamshed Town of Karachi South District was added into this district. Now Karachi East comprises two towns: Jamshed and Gulshan.

In 2022, it was divided into five towns namely Sohrab Goth Town, Safoora Town, Gulshan Town, Jinnah Town and Chanesar Town with 43 union councils and 172 wards respectively.

Demographics
At the time of the 2017 census, Karachi East district had a population of 2,875,315, of which 1,506,788 were males and 1,368,002 females. The entire population was urban. The literacy rate is 76.00%: 78.26% for males and 73.49% for females.

The majority religion is Islam, with 95.31% of the population. Christianity is practiced by 3.14% and Hinduism (including Scheduled Castes) is practiced by 1.38% of the population.

At the time of the 2017 census, 37.51% of the population spoke Urdu, 13.91% Pashto, 13.29% Punjabi, 11.55% Sindhi, 8.38% Saraiki, 3.29% Hindko and 2.34% Balochi as their first language.

Administrative Towns in Karachi East
Following is the list of administrative towns of Karachi East District.

List of Dehs 
The following is a list of Karachi East District's dehs, organised by taluka:

 Gulshan-e-Iqbal taluka (5 dehs)
 Dozan (P)
 Gujero (P)
 Okewari
 Safooran (P)
 Songal (P)
 Gulzar-e-Hijri taluka (5 dehs)
 Bitti Amri
 Dozan (P)
 Gujro-1
 Songal
 Thoming

Hospital and health care facilities 
There are several healthcare facilities in the East District, such as the Aga Khan University Hospital and Liaquat National Hospital.

Education Center 
There are several education center in district east like NED university of Engineering and Technology, University of Karachi & Dow University of Health Sciences (Ojha Campus).

See also

References

 
Districts of Sindh
Districts of Karachi